The Derby de la Mediterranée (known as: Derby de la Mediterranean), is a football match. The match can involve sporting football associations  in the Mediterranean region. Most of the time, it is contested between major French clubs Nice (Côte d'Azur) and Bastia (Corsica) but it can also involve the matches between Olympique de Marseille and AS Monaco.

Head to head record 
Last updated: 20 January 2017

External links 
 Nice-Bastia and Bastia-Nice - Ligue de Football Professionnel
 OGC Nice official site 
 SC Bastia official site 

French football derbies
OGC Nice
SC Bastia
Football in Provence-Alpes-Côte d'Azur
Football in Corsica
1968 establishments in France
Recurring sporting events established in 1968